Propanamide has the chemical formula CH3CH2C=O(NH2). It is the amide of propanoic acid. 

This organic compound is a mono-substituted amide. Organic compounds of the amide group can react in many different organic processes to form other useful compounds for synthesis.

Preparation 
Propanamide can be prepared by the condensation reaction between urea and propanoic acid:

(NH2)2CO + 2CH3CH2COOH -> CH3CH2CO(NH2) + H2O + CO2

or by the dehydration of ammonium propionate: 

(NH4)CH3CH2COO -> CH3CH2CONH2 + H2O

Reactions
Propanamide being an amide can participate in a Hoffman rearrangement to produce ethylamine gas.

References 

Propionamides